Big Brother 2012, also known as Big Brother 13, was the thirteenth series of the British reality television series Big Brother, and the second series to broadcast on Channel 5. The series premiered with a live launch on 5 June 2012 and ran for 70 days, concluding on 13 August 2012. The series was originally planned to run for thirteen weeks, but was cut back to ten weeks in order to accommodate Celebrity Big Brother 10. The series was won by Luke Anderson, who won half of the £100,000 prize fund, with the remainder taken by Conor McIntyre as part of the White Room twist. Anderson is the second transgender contestant to win the show, the first being Nadia Almada who won the show back in 2004. The runner-up was Adam Kelly. The series was announced in April 2011 when Channel 5 signed a two-year contract to air the show. With Big Brother 12 having been broadcast in autumn 2011, this is the first series to air in the show's regular summer period on Channel 5 since it acquired the show from Channel 4 in 2011.

There were 16 original housemates, eight men and eight women, who all entered the house on Day 1. Shortly after the first eviction of the series, Becky Hannon, one of three wildcard housemates, was chosen by the public to enter the house on Day 4. For the first time since Big Brother 4, all housemates left the house as part of the game - no housemate left the House walked from the house for personal reasons or by being ejected. The only housemate not to be evicted by the viewer's Vote was Conor, who was bribed out of the house with half of the £100,000 prize fund as part of a Dilemma in the White Room.

Brian Dowling returned to host the main show, with Emma Willis, Alice Levine and Jamie East also returning to host spin-off show Big Brother's Bit on the Side. This series was sponsored by hair product brand Schwarzkopf Live Color XXL. Though overall ratings were higher than the previous series, the episode broadcast on Friday 27 July recorded the lowest figures in the programme's history at just 615,000 (being broadcast at the same time as the opening ceremony of the 2012 Olympics), then the episode broadcast on 12 August recorded even lower figures at just 483,000 (being broadcast at the same time as the closing ceremony).

This series sparked much controversy, with Ofcom receiving a total of 2,085 complaints regarding the bullying and intimidating behaviour from Conor McIntyre, and 50 more complaints about the same from Caroline Wharram.

Production

Auditions
Auditions for the series returned to London and Manchester, as well as Glasgow and Cardiff for the first time since the show's move to Channel 5, in February 2012. Auditionees could also submit a video to YouTube to be fast-tracked to the producers interviews.

Pre-series
On 10 May, pictures were released of potential housemates being moved into a café in London, whilst having blankets over their heads and bodies to hide their identity. Jamie East and Brian Dowling were also there.

Trailers
On 15 May, Channel 5 aired a 60-second advert for the series. It features an Olympic-style theme promoting the 2012 Summer Olympics in London, with famous Big Brother tasks being included and Dowling, East, Emma Willis and Alice Levine overlooking a Big Brother stadium before Dowling calls "Let the fun and games begin!".

On 1 June, during an interview on Loose Women, Dowling and Willis announced that 16 housemates would enter on launch night. A further housemate will be chosen by public vote from a choice of three "wildcards" selected by East and will enter the house during a live show on Day 4. The three potential contestants – Becky, Bhavesh and Anthony – were announced and confirmed during the Big Brother: The Auditions broadcast.

Sponsorships
The series sponsor was hair product brand Schwarzkopf Live Color XXL. The deal was reportedly worth £2 million.

During the opening titles, a product placement logo is visible in the upper-right hand corner, and at the end of the closing credits, it is seen that not only is the hair product brand Schwarzkopf used as product placement, but also the supermarket Morrisons, which is where the housemates receive their weekly shopping from.

Eye Logo 
For Series 13 the eye was exactly the same shape and size as the previous series. The centre of the eye was a 3D purple sphere that had a white glowing pupil. The rest of the eye was separated into multi-coloured sections that would rotate and spin during the title sequence, at the beginning and end and also when the day and time was being announced by narrator Marcus Bentley.

Title sequence 
The title sequence for the series consisted of a series of spinning coloured blocks which included the original sixteen housemates faces. Becky Hannon, the wildcard was not included in the titles due to her entrance on Day 4.

The House 
The house followed a completely different theme from its previous celebrity series, following a glitzy Las Vegas theme, and was announced to be the largest Big Brother House ever. The House stairs featured another make-over with the spiral stairs being removed from 2011 and the previous Celebrity Series, and replaced by a straight staircase. The Diary Room is situated below the stairs as with every series since 2008, featuring a royal themed Diary Room Chair. The Living Area features a set of sofa seats, as well as the Memory Wall which features squares for Housemates Faces. Each time a housemate was evicted, their face on the Memory Wall went red to signify their eviction.

The Kitchen is to the right of the Dining Table, where the 2011 Bathroom was situated. It features a black design with a breakfast bar and the Store Room. The Bedroom is accessed via the Garden or Corridor in the Living Area. The Bedroom carries a Vegas Showgirl theme throughout with the walls being covered in images of showgirls and shiny textures. There is space for 16 Housemates. The Bathroom is directly opposite the bedroom through the Garden and can only be accessed via the Garden. It features a cave like wall design as well as a posh royal design. It has a Shower and Bathtub.

The Garden structure remains mainly unchanged from 2011, with the pool being situated in the same place. A Hot Tub has been added near the end of the pool, while the Smoking Area is directly at the bottom. There is an outdoor Dining Area, seating area and water feature in the Garden.

During the 'Turf Wars' task, a secret room was revealed to the Blue Team situated off the Living Area. The room was used again as part of the Museum shopping task where Housemates were instructed to go in order to receive treats. The House still features the Large Task Room which is situated in the Garden, and the Small Task Room which is accessed via the Diary Room.

The White Room 
Situated in the corner of the garden, a mysterious 'White Corridor' appeared on Day 57 in which three housemates were to compete in order to win a free pass to the Final. In receiving the fewest nomination votes that week, Conor, Luke S, Sara and Scott had to decide which three of them would move into the white room. With Scott dropping out, Conor, Luke S and Sara entered The White Room. Soon after entering The White Room, the white housemates competed against the main house in several challenges. If the housemates in the main house failed to win 2 out of the 3 challenges, the housemates will only receive an economy shopping budget. The three challenges are as follows:
In the first challenge the main housemates and the white housemates were shown a diagram of 26 cups, with some of them including paint balls. All housemates had to do was hit the cups that didn't have the paint balls in them. The white housemates won.
In the second challenge white housemates took on the main housemates in a mind test in which they were given statements housemates made on their application forms. Ashleigh won the task for the main housemates.
With the current scores tied, the third challenge took place, in which Deana and Luke S went head to head in a test of agility in which they had to pour milk into a long glass tube whilst in body wire which made it hard for housemates to move. Luke S won and therefore the main housemates received an economy shopping budget, whilst the white housemates, Conor, Luke S and Sara won luxury white foods.

On Day 58, housemates in The White Room were told they now had to eliminate someone from the group. Sara volunteered to leave and therefore Conor and Luke S remained in The White Room. As a result, for losing a task in which the white housemates had to guess what the main housemates were dancing to, Conor and Luke S received a punishment: slicing onions and putting them in a bucket in the middle of the room until it reached the top.

On Day 60, the true nature of the White Room task was revealed, when Conor and Luke S were faced with a dilemma. The two housemates were presented with half of the winner's £100,000 prize fund, and were informed that pressing their button would allow them to receive some of the money, at the price of their place in the house. Not accepting the offer would result in the housemate returning to the house with a guaranteed pass to the final night. Starting at £0, the amount of money that one of the two would receive rose over one minute, before reaching a five-second countdown at £50,000. The first housemate to hit his buzzer would leave the house with the amount displayed at the time he pressed the button. Despite initially seeming to encourage Luke S to hit the buzzer, upon seeing his opponent prepare to hit the buzzer, Conor swiped at the last moment, winning £50,000 and leaving the house moments later. For being the last housemate to hit his button Luke S earned a guaranteed pass to the final night of the series.

Wildcard housemates 
Eight potential wildcards were moved to a nearby café in London to take part in several memorable Big Brother challenges, more significantly the Electric Shock task from Big Brother 9. Jamie East and Big Brother 7 housemate Nikki Grahame were present during the run. When all challenges were completed, Jamie had to choose three wildcards to become potential housemates. He chose flute-player Anthony, 'Indian Brian Dowling' Bhavesh, and Becky, who is nicknamed 'The Hurricane' by her friends. All three faced a vote held via the Channel 5 website in which Becky received the most votes to enter the house and therefore entered on Day 4.

Housemates

On Day 1, sixteen housemates entered the House on launch night. The first housemate to enter was Deana who was chosen by random draw. She earned immunity from eviction in Week 1. On Day 4, Becky, one of three potential "wildcard" housemates, was chosen by the public to enter the House after the first evictee.

Weekly summary

Nominations table

Voting results here .

Notes

 : On launch night, Deana was randomly selected to become the first housemate to enter the house, and was immune from the first eviction. However, as part of a twist, she had to nominate three people for eviction immediately after everyone entered the house. The three housemates chosen (Conor, Lydia and Victoria) faced eviction on Day 4. Due to bad weather, the main stage outside was abandoned, and Victoria left the house via diary room. Following the eviction, a wildcard housemate was chosen by the public to enter the house as the seventeenth official housemate.
 : When Becky entered the house, she was set a secret mission. When the housemates stated who their favourite housemate was, Becky had to receive at least one vote otherwise she would face eviction. As she succeeded in receiving one vote, Becky could nominate but could not be nominated by her fellow housemates.
 : On Day 13, Benedict lost his right to nominate as a forfeit in the Timebomb task.
 : For the majority of Week 5 and Week 6, the house was split into two teams, Blue and Green, for a Turf Wars task. On nominations day, the team who won the diary room were the only ones permitted to nominate in Week 6. As punishment for Conor, Caroline and Ashleigh discussing nominations, Big Brother voided the Blue team's claim of the Diary Room and gave it to the Green team. Therefore, only the Green team of Adam, Becky, Deana, Luke S and Scott were eligible to nominate this week. Arron was also a member of the Green team, however he was evicted before this round of nominations took place.
 : Luke S, Sara and Scott won immunity during the Gold Rush shopping task and could nominate but could not be nominated by their fellow housemates. Housemates nominated face-to-face this week round the campfire in the garden using a deck of cards to choose their desired nominated housemates. 
 : As punishment for continuous rule-breaking, every housemate that received at least one nomination was automatically put up for eviction. This resulted in everyone except Becky and Scott facing eviction. Had this not happened then Caroline, Deana and Luke A would have faced eviction. The percentages listed reflect the overall share of the vote each housemate received at the time of each voting freeze. Caroline received 6.65% of the overall vote, but 45.86% of the votes between herself and Luke S.
 : Rather than the housemates nominating this week, housemates' friends and family nominated on their behalf. On Day 57, the White Room was introduced in which Sara, Luke S and Conor competed for a pass to the final. On Day 58, Sara chose to leave the White Room. Shortly after Becky's eviction on Day 60, the remaining White Room residents, Conor and Luke S, were offered up to half of the £100,000 prize fund. However, whoever accepted the offer would have to leave the house immediately, while the other person won immunity from the next eviction and a free pass to the final. Conor chose to take the £50,000 and left the house, while Luke S was guaranteed a place in the live final.
 : Luke S, holder of a free pass to the final, could nominate but could not be nominated by his fellow housemates in the final round of nominations. On Day 67, there was a double eviction.
: For the last four days, the public voted for the housemate they wanted to win, rather than save. The percentages listed reflect the overall share of the vote each housemate received at the time of each voting freeze. Luke A won the series with 53.31% of the votes between himself and Adam.

Ratings and reception

Television ratings
Official ratings are taken from BARB.

Controversy and criticism

Since Day 1, housemates could openly discuss nominations. This decision was highly criticised. The nominations rule has previously made appearances in the first week of Celebrity Big Brother 8, from the fifth week in Big Brother 12 onwards, and the whole series of Celebrity Big Brother 9. On 20 June, a poll was released on to channel5.com for the public to vote whether or not housemates should discuss nominations. With over 90% of the vote saying housemates should not discuss nominations, the rule was changed back to housemates being forbidden from discussing nominations as revealed to the housemates on Day 16.

Two housemates in Big Brother 13, Conor McIntyre and Caroline Wharram, have been criticised with numerous accounts of bullying between other fellow housemates. Media regulator Ofcom received nearly 1,000 complaints. According to Broadcast, media regulator Ofcom received 356 complaints about Conor's comments towards Deana on 25 June episode by midnight on the night of transmission, and the figure later rose to over 1,000.

Furthermore, Caroline received criticism when she branded Adam "a gorilla" after a task which saw him spinning her around on a roundabout. Caroline moaned about the former LA gangster: "Adam is just a gorilla, he's not even funny. He snores like a family of dragons, it's just rude."

Talking about her Sick n' Mix task with Adam, Caroline told Scott Mason: "I just don't understand why he had to do it, fucking wanker. He's horrible. He's just a ridiculous gorilla, bowl haircut, no sanitation, he's just disgusting." Ofcom has confirmed that they received 50 complaints over the jibe, despite Big Brother's formal warning to Caroline over the remarks. The show's executive producer said on 29 June: "There would be very serious consequences for Conor or for any housemate if they were to continue to use language that was unacceptable like that within the House."

References

External links
 Official website
 Big Brother at Endemol UK
 

2012 in British television
2012 British television seasons
13
Channel 5 (British TV channel) reality television shows